The 2003 Vuelta a Asturias was the 47th edition of the Vuelta a Asturias road cycling stage race, which was held from 13 May to 17 May 2003. The race started and finished in Oviedo. The race was won by Fabian Jeker of the  team.

General classification

References

Vuelta Asturias
Vuelta a Asturias